Marco-Paul Peltzer (18 November 1909 – 18 March 1983) was a Belgian ice hockey player. He competed in the men's tournament at the 1928 Winter Olympics.

References

External links
 

1909 births
1983 deaths
Ice hockey players at the 1928 Winter Olympics
Olympic ice hockey players of Belgium
People from Eupen
Sportspeople from Liège Province